The Nordic hamstring curl (NHC) is an exercise in which a person kneels with their feet fixed in position and lowers their body by extending the knee. It reduces hamstring injuries in athletes, and is commonly used as a form of injury prevention. NHC increases strength of the hamstrings and length of the fascia, sprint speed, and change of direction ability. It is debated whether NHC is an open or closed chain exercise. NHC has been compared to the razor hamstring curl.

References

Bodyweight exercises
Hamstring